Deathless is the sixth studio album by American metal band Throwdown. The album was released on November 10, 2009 in the US through E1 Music, January 22, 2010 through Nuclear Blast Records in Europe, and January 25, 2010 in the UK, also through Nuclear Blast Records. Deathless is the first album by Throwdown released through E1 (formerly Koch Records) and Nuclear Blast since the band switched from Trustkill Records at the end of 2008.

Reception

Commercial performance
Deathless reached No. 26 on Billboards Independent Albums chart on November 28, 2009, and stayed on the chart for one week.

Critical response

Deathless received positive to mixed reviews from critics. Some critics praised Throwdown for changing the sound from their previous hardcore punk sound, other critics did not like their decision to change their sound to a more groove metal sound. Most critics agreed that Throwdown had moved to a more Pantera-sounding style. Some, however, even likened the band's new sound to groups such as Godsmack and Mudvayne.

Track listing
All songs were written by Dave Peters and Mark Choiniere. 
 "The Scythe" – 4:00
 "This Continuum" – 3:45
 "Tombs" – 4:05
 "The Blinding Light" – 6:12
 "Widowed" – 5:51
 "Headed South" – 5:20
 "Serpent Noose" – 4:12
 "Ouroboros Rising" – 4:24
 "Skeleton Vanguard" – 4:24
 "Pyre & Procession" – 4:07
 "Black Vatican" – 3:22
 "Burial at Sea" – 5:31

PersonnelThrowdown Dave Peters – vocals
 Mark Choiniere – guitars
 Mark Mitchell – bass
 Jarrod Alexander – drumsProduction and art'
 Mudrock – producer
 Al Fujisaki – producer, digital editing
 Chris "Zeuss" Harris – mixer
 Alan Douches – mastering
 Ryan Clark – art design
 Jerad Knudson – cover photo

References

2009 albums
Throwdown (band) albums
MNRK Music Group albums
Nuclear Blast albums